The Treaty of 1022 was an agreement between the Kingdom of Georgia and the Byzantine Empire. It was signed by Georgian King George I and the Byzantine Emperor Basil II.

The major political and military event during George I's reign, a war against the Byzantine Empire, had its roots back in the 990s, when the Georgian prince David III of Tao, following his abortive rebellion against Emperor Basil II, had to agree to cede his extensive possessions in Tao to the emperor on his death. All the efforts by David's stepson and George's father, Bagrat III, to prevent these territories from being annexed to the empire went in vain. Young and ambitious, George launched a campaign to restore the David III’ succession to Georgia and occupied Tao in 1015–1016. Basil II led his army against Georgia in 1021. An exhausting war lasted for two years, and ended in a decisive Byzantine victory, forcing George to agree to a peace treaty, with the following terms:

 Georgia had to abandon its claims over Tao; 
 Georgia had to surrender several southwestern possessions (Klarjeti, Kola and Javakheti) to the Byzantine Empire; 
 George I had to give his three-year-old son, Bagrat IV, as a hostage to Constantinople.

References 

Ceasefires
11th-century treaties
Georgia 1022
Byzantine Empire 1022
1020s in the Byzantine Empire
Basil II
1022 in Asia